Computer software for computer-assisted organic synthesis (CAOS) is used in organic chemistry and computational chemistry to facilitate the tasks of designing and predicting chemical reactions. The CAOS problem reduces to identifying a series of chemical reactions which can, from starting materials, produce a desired target molecule. CAOS algorithms typically use two databases: a first one of known chemical reactions and a second one of known starting materials (i.e., typically molecules available commercially). Desirable synthetic plans cost less, have high yield, and avoid using hazardous reactions and intermediates. Typically cast as a planning problem, significant progress has been made in CAOS.

Some examples of CAOS packages are:
 Spaya - Retrosynthesis planning tool freely accessible provided by Iktos
 IBM Rxn - 
 AiZynthFinder - A freely accessible open source retrosynthetic planning tool developed as a collaboration between AstraZeneca and the University of Bern. AiZynthFinder predicts synthetic routes to a given target compound, and can be retrained on a users own dataset whether from public or proprietary sources.

 Manifold - Compound searching and retrosynthesis planning tool freely accessible to academic users, developed by PostEra
 WODCA – no trial version; proprietary software
 Organic Synthesis Exploration Tool (OSET) – open-source software, abandoned
 CHIRON – no trial version; proprietary software
 SynGen – demo version; proprietary software; a unique program for automatic organic synthesis generation; focuses on generating the shortest, lowest cost synthetic routes for a given target organic compound, and is thus a useful tool for synthesis planning
 LHASA – demo available but not linked (?); proprietary software
 SYLVIA – demo version; proprietary software; rapidly evaluates the ease of synthesis of organic compounds; can prioritize thousands of structures (e.g., generated by de novo design experiments or retrieved from large virtual compound libraries) according to their synthetic complexity
 ChemPlanner (formerly ARChem – Route Designer) - is an expert system to help chemists design viable synthetic routes for their target molecules; the knowledge base of reaction rules is algorithmically derived from reaction databases, and commercially available starting materials are used as termination points for the retrosynthetic search
 ICSYNTH – demo available; proprietary software; A computer aided synthesis design tool that enables chemists to generate synthetic pathways for a target molecule, and a multistep interactive synthesis tree; at its core is an algorithmic chemical knowledge base of transform libraries that are automatically generated from reaction databases.
 Chematica (Now known as Synthia)
 ASKCOS – Open-source suite of synthesis planning and computational chemistry tools.

See also 
 Comparison of software for molecular mechanics modeling
 Molecular design software
 Molecule editor
 Molecular modeling on GPU
 List of software for nanostructures modeling
 Semi-empirical quantum chemistry methods
 Computational chemical methods in solid state physics, with periodic boundary conditions
 Valence bond programs

References 

Organic chemistry
Computational chemistry software
Molecular modelling software
Physics software
Lists of software